Dr. Christopher Souder House is a historic home located at Larwill, Whitley County, Indiana. It was built in 1877, and is a two-story, cross plan, Italianate style brick dwelling.  It has a shallow hipped roof with overhanging eaves.  It features a wraparound porch and segmental arched windows with decorative pressed metal hoods.

It was listed on the National Register of Historic Places in 2005.

References

Houses on the National Register of Historic Places in Indiana
Italianate architecture in Indiana
Houses completed in 1877
Buildings and structures in Whitley County, Indiana
National Register of Historic Places in Whitley County, Indiana
1877 establishments in Indiana